Proposition 48 may refer to:
 Proposition 48 (NCAA), proposition for the (USA) National Collegiate Athletics Association
California Proposition 48 (2002), Californian ballot proposition